Trzebiatów (pronounced  ; ; formerly ) is a town in the West Pomeranian Voivodeship, Poland, with 10,119 inhabitants (2016). Trzebiatów is located on the Rega River in the north-western part of Poland, roughly 9 kilometers south of the Baltic coast.

Trzebiatów obtained town rights in 1277 under Pomeranian rulers who had invited German settlers to populate the area. It was part of the Duchy of Pomerania within the Holy Roman Empire. In 1416, the town became part of the Hanseatic League, then served as an important trade post and developed architecturally, with a typical Brick Gothic-style influence. It had trading connections with larger Hanseatic cities such as Danzig (Gdańsk), Lübeck and Hamburg. From 1648 the town was part of Brandenburg-Prussia, the later Kingdom of Prussia. After World War II the town became part of Poland. The German population was expelled and the town was resettled with Poles. It escaped destruction during the war and its preserved Old Town was registered as a protected historical monument of Poland.

History

The lower Rega area around Gryfice and Trzebiatów was the site of a West Slavic or Lechitic gród (fortified settlement) in the 9th century. The first recorded mention of the town comes from 1170 when the Pomeranian Duke Casimir I granted a few villages and oversight of a church in the town to settlers from Lund in Sweden. The region was briefly invaded by an expanding Poland during the reign of the first Polish rulers Mieszko I and Bolesław I the Brave. It was part of the Duchy of Pomerania, which separated itself from Poland as a result of the fragmentation of Poland. In the first half of the 13th century, German settlers invited by the Pomeranian Duke Barnim I began to settle in the area. In 1277, this settlement received town privileges under the Lübeck Law. 

In 1504, Johannes Bugenhagen moved to the town and became Rector of the local school. On 13 December 1534 a diet was assembled in the town, where the Dukes Barnim XI and Philip I as well as the nobility officially introduced Lutheranism to Pomerania, against the vote of Erasmus von Manteuffel-Arnhausen, Prince-Bishop of Cammin. In the following month Bugenhagen drafted the new church order (Kirchenordnung), founding the Pomeranian Lutheran church (today's Pomeranian Evangelical Church).

As a dowager, Sophia of Schleswig-Holstein-Sonderburg (1579–1658), widow of Philip II, Duke of Pomerania, lived in Treptow. Sophia's dower was a former nunnery, which she converted into a palace. While in Swedish service and thereafter Duke Francis Henry of Saxe-Lauenburg spent a lot of time with Duchess dowager Sophia in Treptow. Sophia's and Francis Henry's fathers were cousins. On 13 December 1637 Francis Henry and Marie Juliane of Nassau-Siegen (1612–1665) married in Treptow. Their first child was born in Treptow in 1640. Francis Henry also served Sophia as administrator of the estates pertaining to her dower.

In 1637 Philip II died leaving the Pomeranian ducal house extinct. At this point the duchy came under Swedish occupation with the Brandenburgian electors claiming succession in Pomerania. After the Thirty Years War the town became part of Brandenburg-Prussia in the Peace of Westphalia of 1648. It was part of the province of Pomerania.

 
In 1750 the local palace was refurbished in classicist style for General Frederick Eugene of Württemberg, who resided there – with interruptions – until 1763. In the late 18th century the Polish noblewoman and writer Maria Wirtemberska née Czartoryska resided at the palace, and her early works and translations were created here. The painter Jan Rustem visited her several times, and his paintings were part of the palace's art collection. The palace now houses a State public library, founded in 1946 and named after Maria Wirtemberska née Czartoryska since 1999.

With the end of the Holy Roman Empire in 1806, Brandenburg-Pomerania, already since 1618 ruled in personal union with Ducal Prussia (Kingdom since 1701), also merged into Prussia and the different German confederacies and empires of which it formed part since. 

Near the end of the World War II, in February 1945, despite the approaching front, the authorities did not permit the evacuation of the town's population. It was not until March 4 that the order to evacuate was issued, the day after remnants of the army had retreated from the town, leaving the civilian population to fend for itself. After the war the central and eastern part of Western Pomerania, including Trzebiatów, fell into the Soviet Zone of Occupation. The Soviets, however, placed it under the administration of Communist Poland who began ruthlessly expelling the population who had not managed to flee. The town's indigenous German population was expelled, and the town was resettled with Poles, in accordance with Potsdam Agreement.

Since 1 January 1999, the town has been within West Pomerania Voivodeship, upon its formation from the former Szczecin and Koszalin Voivodeships.

Culture

Trzebiatów's Day of the Buckwheat is a celebration during the first week of August. It is held in memory of the day when the town guard mistakenly dropped a hot bowl of buckwheat meal on invaders from the nearby town of Gryfice, alarming the whole town and ultimately saving it. Inhabitants of Trzebiatów celebrate that event with dances, concerts, competitions and by eating cereal with ham and bacon.

Notable people 
 Johannes Aepinus (1499–1553), theologian and reformer
 Johannes Bugenhagen (1505–1521), Pomeranian reformer, rector at Treptow city school
 Maria Wirtemberska (1768–1864), Polish noblewoman, writer and translator
 Johann Gustav Droysen (1808–1884) a German historian
 Ferdinand von Arnim (1814–1866) a German architect and watercolour-painter
 Gustav Queck (1822–1897) a German educator and classical philologist
 Marcus Kalisch (1828–1885), Jewish scholar, a pioneer in the critical study of the Old Testament 
 Siegfried Sudhaus (1863–1914), German classical philologist
 Bartosz Ława (born 1979), Polish footballer, over 300 pro games

Nobility 
 Frederick I of Württemberg (1754–1816), King of Württemberg
 Duke Louis of Württemberg (1756–1817) second son of Friedrich II Eugen, Duke of Württemberg
 Duke Ferdinand Frederick Augustus of Württemberg (1763–1834) the fifth son of Frederick II Eugene, Duke of Württemberg
 Duchess Frederica of Württemberg (1765–1785) daughter of Frederick II Eugene, Duke of Württemberg
 Duchess Elisabeth of Württemberg (1767–1790) Archduchess of Austria by marriage to Archduke Francis of Austria.

Twin towns - sister cities
Trzebiatów is twinned with:

 Brwinów, Poland
 Großräschen, Germany
 Istebna, Poland
 Sjöbo, Sweden
 Wandlitz, Germany

References

Shtetls
Cities and towns in West Pomeranian Voivodeship
Gryfice County